The Night Stalker is an American made for television horror film which aired on ABC on January 18, 1972, as their ABC Movie of the Week. In the film, an investigative reporter, played by Darren McGavin, comes to suspect that a serial killer in the Las Vegas area is actually a vampire.

The film was based on the then-unpublished novel by Jeff Rice titled The Kolchak Papers (a.k.a. The Kolchak Tapes). Rice said he wrote the novel because, "I'd always wanted to write a vampire story, but more because I wanted to write something that involved Las Vegas." Rice had difficulty finding a publisher willing to buy the manuscript until agent Rick Ray read it and realized the novel would make a good movie. The 1973 novel (renamed The Night Stalker) wasn't published until after the TV movie had already aired, and was delayed according to Rice because the publisher wanted both Rice's original novel and the 1974 sequel The Night Strangler (written by Rice but based on the screenplay by author Richard Matheson) so "they could be placed on the top of the publisher's list in the 1 and 2 positions for 1974."

Directed by John Llewellyn Moxey (a veteran of theatrical and TV movies) who shot the movie over 12 days, adapted by Richard Matheson, and produced by Dan Curtis (best known at the time for Dark Shadows), The Night Stalker became the highest rated original TV movie on US television, earning a 33.2 rating and 48 share. The TV movie did so well it was released overseas as a theatrical movie and inspired a sequel TV movie titled The Night Strangler, which aired on January 16, 1973, a single-season TV series of twenty episodes titled Kolchak: The Night Stalker which ran on ABC between September 1974 and May 1975, and a short lived 2005 TV series called Night Stalker.

Actor Darren McGavin recalled that his involvement began when "My representatives called to say that ABC had purchased the rights to a book called The Kolchak Papers. They were into a kind of first draft of a script by Richard Matheson, and they called the agency to ask them if I'd be interested in doing it. My representative read it and called me." The popular TV movie, along with its sequel and the TV series, provided the inspiration for Chris Carter's The X-Files. Carter featured actor Darren McGavin in the show as a tribute to the actor and the project that inspired his popular series. Originally Carter had wanted McGavin to play Kolchak, but the actor elected not to, so the role was rewritten, making McGavin's character Arthur Dales, the "father of the X-files".

Plot
Kolchak, sitting on the bed of a sleazy hotel room, is listening to a replay of his dictation on his portable tape recorder. The notes are about a series of murders that have plagued the Las Vegas Strip, and a cover-up of those events by the authorities.  All of the victims had their bodies drained of blood. When a meeting is conducted with the sheriff's department, the FBI, the police, and others, they discover the suspect's true identity is Janos Skorzeny, who is the prime suspect in multiple homicides extending back years, involving massive loss of blood. When Skorzeny attempts to rob a hospital, the police are called to stop him. Skorzeny is shot multiple times without effect, and manages to escape by outrunning a police car and motorcycle.

Kolchak's girlfriend, Gail Foster, a casino 'change girl', urges him to explore vampire lore. The evidence persuades Kolchak to suspect that Skorzeny is a vampire, much to the disbelief of his boss Anthony "Tony" Vincenzo. Following yet another failed attempt to capture Skorzeny despite overwhelming police force, the authorities strike a deal with Kolchak to eschew their traditional investigative methods for his vampire-centric approach in exchange for giving him exclusive rights to the story. Acting on a tip, Kolchak locates Skorzeny's safe house and pursues the story on his own, fearful that the police will renege on their deal. Compromised when the vampire returns, Kolchak struggles to escape and is nearly killed by Skorzeny before his friend FBI Agent Bernie Jenks, alerted to Kolchak's presence in the house, arrives and joins the fight. Realizing that dawn has broken, Kolchak and Jenks force a weakened Skorzeny back against a sun-drenched staircase and stake the vampire, just as authorities burst through the front door.

Kolchak writes his version of the story for the newspaper and proposes to his girlfriend, telling her that they will both move to New York City. The authorities, however, unwilling to publicly admit that Skorzeny was the vampire Kolchak claimed, print a false version of the newspaper story with his byline and threaten to charge him with first degree murder unless he quietly leaves Las Vegas. They also tell him that his girlfriend Gail has already been forced to leave the city for being "an undesirable element." Carl exhausts his savings placing personal advertisements across the country in a futile attempt to find her.

The final scene reverts to Kolchak in his sleazy hotel room. He explains that if anyone tries to verify the events in the book, they will find that all witnesses have either left town, are not talking, or are dead. He concludes by noting that Skorzeny and all his victims have been cremated, destroying any further ability to investigate the matter and eliminating the possibility that those killed by Skorzeny would in turn rise as vampires and perpetuate the curse.

Cast
Darren McGavin as Carl Kolchak
Carol Lynley as Gail Foster
Simon Oakland as Tony Vincenzo
Ralph Meeker as Bernie Jenks
Claude Akins as Sheriff Warren A. Butcher
Charles McGraw as Police Chief Ed Masterson
Kent Smith as District Attorney Tom Paine
Elisha Cook Jr. as Mickey Crawford
Stanley Adams as Fred Hurley
Larry Linville as Dr. Robert Makurji
Jordan Rhodes as Dr. John O'Brien
Barry Atwater as Janos Skorzeny

Subsequent history
The Night Stalker garnered the highest ratings of any TV film at that time (33.2 rating - 48 share). That resulted in a 1973 follow-up TV film called The Night Strangler and a planned 1974 film titled The Night Killers, which instead evolved into the 1974-1975 television series  Kolchak: The Night Stalker, with McGavin reprising his role in both. An episode of the series titled "The Vampire" was an actual sequel to Stalker, deriving its story from characters introduced in the film. The " undesirable element " is a holdover from the original script where Gail was more clearly inferred to be a Las Vegas prostitute that Kolchack was romantically involved with. This was changed when standards and practices had her changed into a casino employee.

Following the series' cancellation, the franchise was still highly regarded enough to prompt two more TV films, which were created by editing together material from four previous episodes of the series, with some additional narration provided by McGavin as Kolchak to help connect the plot lines. No new footage was included.

On September 29, 2005 ABC aired a remake of the 1974 series Kolchak: The Night Stalker, titled Night Stalker. ABC owned the rights to the original TV films, but not the Universal TV series, and were limited only to using characters that had appeared in the films.

Home media
The film was released in 2004 by MGM Home Entertainment as a double feature DVD with The Night Strangler. The DVD also has a 21-minute interview with producer and director Dan Curtis divided between each film: 14 minutes of him discussing Stalker, and on the flipside, seven minutes of him discussing Strangler. Both films, issued on October 2, 2018, were released separately on HD Blu-Ray and DVD, featuring new 4K transfers by Kino Lorber, Inc.

See also
List of American films of 1972
List of Kolchak:The Night Stalker episodes
List of films set in Las Vegas
Crackle of Death (3rd produced movie)
Vampire films

References

External links

1972 horror films
1972 television films
1972 films
1970s comedy horror films
1970s thriller films
ABC Movie of the Week
Occult detective fiction
1970s English-language films
Films based on American novels
Films set in the Las Vegas Valley
Films about journalists
American horror television films
Films with screenplays by Richard Matheson
Films directed by John Llewellyn Moxey
American vampire films
Films adapted into comics
1972 comedy films
The Night Stalker (franchise)
1970s American films